This article is a list of newspapers in Malawi.

Overview
Under the dictatorship of Hastings Kamuzu Banda, which lasted from the country's founding in 1965 until 1994, there was no independent, free press in Malawi. Foreign correspondents were also banned. After the transition to multi-party democracy in 1994, much greater freedom was granted, triggering the birth of many newspapers. Most of these failed quickly due to high costs and the lack of skilled staff. Two main media organisations remain that still publish newspapers. The relative high cost of the newspapers means they remain the preserve of the wealthy. Most have a mix of English and Chichewa articles.

List of news publications

See also
 Media of Malawi
 List of radio stations in Africa: Malawi

References

Bibliography
  
 
 
 

Malawi
Newspapers